Deh-e Hasanali (also Romanized as Deh-e Ḩasan‘alī; also known as Ḩasan‘alī) is a village in Firuzabad Rural District, Firuzabad District, Selseleh County, Lorestan Province, Iran. At the 2006 census, its population was 552, in 122 families.

References 

Towns and villages in Selseleh County